August 2017

See also

References

 08
August 2017 events in the United States